Mesquite is a common name for several plants in the genus Prosopis, which contains over 40 species of small leguminous trees. They are native to dry areas in the Americas. 
They have extremely long roots to seek water from very far under ground. As a legume, mesquites are one of the few sources of fixed nitrogen in the desert habitat. These trees bloom from spring to summer. They often produce fruits known as "pods". They are deciduous and depending on location and rainfall have either deep or shallow roots. Prosopis is considered long-lived because of the low mortality rate after the dicotyledonous stage and juveniles are also able to survive in conditions with low light and drought. The Cahuilla indigenous people of western North America were known to eat the seeds of mesquite.

History 
Prosopis spp. have been in North America since the Pliocene era and their wood has been dated to 3300 yr BP. They are thought to have evolved with megafauna in the New World.  The loss of North American megafauna at the end of the Pleistocene era gave way to one theory of how the Prosopis spp. were able to survive. One theory is that the loss of the megafauna allowed Prosopis spp. to use their fruit pods to attract other organisms to spread their seeds;  then, with the introduction of livestock, they were able to spread into grasslands. Another is that Prosopis spp. had always been present in grasslands, but recurring fires had delayed plant and seed development before the emergence of livestock and grazing.

Etymology
The English word mesquite is borrowed from the Spanish word mezquite, which in turn was borrowed from the Nāhuatl term mizquitl.

Habitat
They may have one or multiple trunks with a multitude of branches. They have bipinnate leaflets of a light green to blue hue that cast a light to deep shade, depending on the species. Many varieties form thorns. When cut to the ground, the tree can often recover.

Uses
Once the pod is dry, the whole pod is edible and can be ground into flour and made into bread.

Mesquite is native to the US and can be used as a type of lumber. It was a popular type of wood used by early Spaniards to build ships, but is now used most commonly for high-end rustic furniture and cabinets. Scraps and small pieces are used commonly as wood for cooking with smoke in Southern states. 

Red-orange sap can be found on the branches of mesquite trees during the summer. This sap was used by those who lived in the desert for several medicinal treatments. The sap was used as a salve and spread on burns and cuts to speed up the healing process. Gargling a mixture of water and sap was used to soothe sore throats, and the same mixture was said to be able to cure upset stomachs.

As an introduced and invasive species

Prosopis spp. are different from most invasive species because they are highly invasive in both their native and introduced ranges. Their impacts on the invaded ecosystems include changes to hydrological, energy, and nutrient cycling, as well as consequences to biodiversity and primary production. Prosopis spp. density and canopy cover influence the herbaceous layer and native shrubs and are factors in the changes to the ecosystem.

Although North America is its native range, due to an imbalance within this ecosystem has been able to spread rapidly. It is considered the most common and widely spread "pest" plant in Texas. In Mexico and the US, the two most problematic species are honey mesquite (Prosopis glandulosa) and velvet mesquite (Prosopis velutina).  
Australia is also affected by the introduction of Prosopis spp., in particular, the P. pallida, P. glandulosa, P. velutina, and their hybrids with P. juliflora. Prosopis spp. are ranked nationally as one of the 20 most significant weeds. They now cover almost  of land. Prosopis spp. were originally introduced to help with erosion because of their deep root systems.

Honey mesquite has been introduced to parts of Africa, Asia, and Australia and is considered by the World Conservation Union as one of the world's most problematic invasive species. Its spread into grasslands is mostly attributed to the introduction of domestic livestock, although other factors include climate change, overgrazing, and the reduction of fire frequency. Although Prosopis spp. are naturally occurring in these areas, these changes have resulted in their being able to successfully outcompete other native plants and they are now considered invasive species because they are able to take advantage of vulnerable ecosystems.

Since Australia is a hot and semiarid region, Prosopis spp. have been able to become naturalized. The last known specimens of P. laevigata were eradicated in 2006, but given the possibility of lingering seeds in the soil seed bank, Biosecurity Queensland waited 15 years and declared Australia free of P. laevigata in 2021.

In India, mesquite had been introduced decades ago, but until recently,  its effects had not been studied. This genus has been pushing out the Indian wild ass (Equus hemionus khur). This herbivorous mammal eats the pods of Prosopis spp, which was one of the intended purposes of its introduction. Through digesting and excreting the seeds, the Indian wild asses are providing the habitat needed for germination. The  Indian Wild Ass Sanctuary is experiencing mesquite invasion of roughly  a year. By overtaking the land, the dense canopy cover of mesquite has made it so native vegetation cannot grow. It has also made watering holes inaccessible to the animals within this region. This lack of resources and range is forcing the endangered Indian wild ass into human landscapes and agriculture fields and locals are killing these asses to protect their crops.

Control strategies 
Controlling mesquite is a challenging task. One  often-used method is mechanical control. This can be effective with high mortality rates if stems are cut at least  underground. Another method is through the application of herbicides, done on an individual plant basis. Another physical option for control is through fires. Some species of mesquite are fire-sensitive, while others are fire-tolerant. For those that are fire-sensitive, this method can be highly effective, but those that are fire-tolerant require hot and intense fires to be effective. In Australia, scientists are trying biological control methods. They have introduced multiple insects, but the most effective in causing high population level impact is the leaf-tying moth (Evippe spp.). The most recommended method for managing Prosopis, both in native and introduced ranges, is by targeting large numbers of plants either through herbicide or physical removal. Also, research is being done on using satellite and aerial images to assess canopy cover and determine which ranges should be targeted.

Species
 Prosopis alba (white mesquite)
 Prosopis cineraria
 Prosopis chilensis (Chilean mesquite)
 Prosopis glandulosa (honey mesquite)
 Prosopis humilis
 Prosopis juliflora
 Prosopis laevigata (smooth mesquite)
 Prosopis nigra (black mesquite)
 Prosopis pallida
 Prosopis pubescens (screwbean mesquite)
 Prosopis reptans (tornillo)
 Prosopis strombulifera (creeping mesquite)
 Prosopis velutina (velvet mesquite)

Gallery

See also
 Mesquite Bosque
 Tamaulipan mezquital

References

External links

 USDA NRCS Plants Database
 Honey mesquite, Screwbean mesquite, and Western mesquite at Texas A&M's Plant Answers
 Honey mesquite at the Texas Tree Planting Guide
 AgNews article on wood to ethanol using mesquite
Health Benefits of Mesquite
 
 

 
Drought-tolerant trees
Edible legumes
Garden plants of North America
North American desert flora
Ornamental trees
Plant common names